is a Japanese manga series created by . It details the struggles of young Nate Torres to go from a benchwarmer to a street-ball player. The story's scope expands as he makes friends and eventually becomes a member of his high school basketball team. It was compiled into 29 tankōbon volumes.

In North America, it was published by Tokyopop. The manga goes up to 9 volumes under the name Harlem Beat, while volumes 12+ are published under the series title Rebound. As of August 31, 2009, the Rebound volumes are out of print.

Jason Thompson stated that it was the author's "most popular manga". According to Thompson the work "assumes that the reader knows basketball."

English version
Thompson stated it was "the first serious sports manga published in America." Some editing of nudity and self-insert references as well as changes of character names are in the English version. Thompson argued "the Americanization and changed names don't hurt the story that much".

The English publication did not include volumes 10 and 11; a summary of volumes 10 and 11 was included in Volume 12.

Characters
Nate Torres ( Japanese version) - main character of Harlem Beat. In the original Japanese version, Tohru Naruse goes by his nickname Naruchiyo and is often associated with a monkey, serving as a mascot to the team. Nate is a perennial bench-warmer. Lacking in both coolness and talent, he is the most unlikely basketball player. But through persistence and support from his friends, Nate slowly teaches himself the art of basketball. In the process, he slowly builds up his confidence and begins to realize his dream of success on the high school basketball court. He also develops feelings for Mizzy Kusuda, an ex-classmate, but later falls for another girl named Tomomi Koizumi. His signature move in basketball is known as the airwalk. Nate incorporated many flashy moves into his game, such as his signature airwalk, evolved lay-up (double-clutch) miracle J, and his invincible lay-ups. Every single one of these skills are pulled off subconsciously, indicating a preternatural natural talent for the sport.
 Thompson states that Nate is "a lovable, sincere little guy".
Mizzy Kusuda ( Japanese version) -  Mizuki is Nate's ex-classmate and close friend when he was in the primary school. She helps Nate succeed, teaching him the down and dirty side to street ball: no rules, no fouls, and no crying, she teaches him how to win. Eventually, she revealed to Shurman that she was in love with him ever since she first met him under his street name, which was Shoe. Her love was not returned, however, with Shurman saying that Shoe was gone.
Kyle "Oz" Ozman ( Japanese version) - Kyle is a tough kid, high school drop-out with an axe to grind with everyone. But often his bark is worse than his bite. He and Nate are the only two players in the history of street hoops to ever score on the powerhouse team, 3-Slam. When they get together with Mizzy, Team Scratch is born. Oz is a hoodlum from the streets. He hangs with a rough crowd, and he brings the same attitude to the courts. Nate, his own teammate, is even scared of him. Throughout the series, Kyle has a crush on Mizzy, which eventually develops into love. He is also not very good when it comes to girls.
 - He is also a member of Scratch. He is Naruse's best friend. Sawamura plays street basketball to earn money as he lives by himself. He likes money very much and as a result turns towards gambling. His affinity to risk explains his constant attempts to sink only the three-point shots. He stole a score from Three Men by his tricks. He is the best three-point shooter and called a "Miracle Shooter". He is not good in stamina, but he is very good at tricks. His famous nickname is Fox (Kitsune) Guy, as he is really tricky and loves gambling. He is a clever guy too. His only weaknesses are money and ghosts. In a flashback, it is revealed that Sawamura's father abandoned him and he was soon picked up by a Yakuza member named Fujita. Fujita taught him how to fight, including the ways of the streets. After Fujita was shot by one of his own, he was captured and confined, leaving Sawamura to live on his own.
 Shurman Shuji - Shurman is considered to be a "big brother" in the Johnan team. He also secretly leads a double life as Shoe, the leader of the streetball team House of Three Slam (Threemen's Hoop).
  - The captain of the Johnan varsity basketball team.
  - A member of the Johnan team, Kobayashi is described by the Tokyopop website as "samurai-like." He also is good at reading books.
 Tamotsu Suzuki - A member of the Johnan Team.
 Hijiri Imagawa - A member of the Johnan Team.
  - A member of the Johnan Team.
  - A member of the Johnan Team, he is nicknamed .
 Kim Yabe - The manager of the Johnan team, Yabe is described by the Tokyopop website as a "kick-ass girl who doesn't take crap from anyone."
  - Higa leads the Kyan Marine Industry High School basketball team.
  and  - Twins who play on the Kyan team.
 Tetsuya Kemp Sugeran - Sugeran, a member of Kyan, is considered to be the strong player on the team.
  - A member of the Kyan team, Tamanaha has long, dark hair. The Tokyopop website describes him as having "a pleasant personality."
 The Coach of the Kyan team
 Bud Okuda ( - Okuda is a writer for "Hoop Town Tokyo," which documents the streetball culture in Tokyo.
 Mr. Morita - A basketball journalist
  - Takagi, the star player of the Kanakita Northern Industry High School basketball team, is considered to be a "shoo-in" for the Olympic team.
  - A member of the Felicia Girls School team, Koizumi is a good player on the court, but is dizzy and accident-prone off of the court
  - A teammate of Koizumi, Ikeda is described by the Tokyopop site as "far more practical" than her "daffy companion."
  - A point guard on the Tsukuba team, Mikami plays seriously
  - Majima is a forward on the Tsukuba team
 Unohara
Shades
T- Rock
Bucky

Related products
There is a Playstation game Harlem Beat: You're the One published by Konami in Japan in 1999. There are also some novels.

References

External links

 Official web page on Tokyopop's web site (Archive)

Basketball in anime and manga
1994 manga
Kodansha manga
Shōnen manga
Tokyopop titles